This is a list of the 111 present and extant Viscounts in the Peerages of England, Scotland, Great Britain, Ireland, and the United Kingdom. Note that it does not include extant viscountcies which have become merged (either through marriage or elevation) with higher peerages and are today in use only as subsidiary titles. For a more complete list, which adds these "hidden" viscounties as well as extinct, dormant, abeyant, and forfeit ones, see List of Viscountcies.

Order of precedence 

The general order of precedence among Viscounts is:
Viscounts of England 
Viscounts of Scotland 
Viscounts of Great Britain
Viscounts of Ireland
Viscounts of the United Kingdom
However, the viscountcies of Ireland which were created after the Acts of Union 1800 yield precedence to older United Kingdom viscountcies; one of these post-Union Irish viscountcies is older than any viscountcy of the United Kingdom, one other remains as a viscountcy, two are extinct, and one is now a subordinate title.

Viscounts in the Peerages of Britain and Ireland

List of heirs of Viscounts in the peerages of the British Isles

Heirs apparent

 Hon. Henry Devereux, eldest of the Viscount Hereford
 Hon. Lucius Cary, Master of Falkland, the eldest son of the Viscount of Falkland
 Hon. Christopher Arbuthnott, Master of Arbuthnott, eldest son of the Viscount of Arbuthnott
 Hon. Max Makgill, Master of Oxfuird, eldest son of the Viscount of Oxfuird
 Hon Oliver Lyttelton, eldest son of the Viscount Cobham
 Hon. Evelyn Boscawen, eldest son of the Viscount Falmouth
 Hon. Archibald Hood, eldest son of the Viscount Hood
 Hon. Theo Butler, eldest son of the Viscount Mountgarret
 Hon. Charles Skeffington, eldest son of the Viscount Massereene
 Hon. Shane Caulfeild, eldest son of the Viscount Charlemont
 Hon. Connor Chetwynd, eldest son of the Viscount Chetwynd
 Hon. Ashley Midleton, eldest son of the Viscount Midleton
 Hon. Gustavus Hamilton-Russell, eldest son of the Viscount Boyne
 Hon. Henry Gage, eldest son of the Viscount Gage
 Hon. Geoffrey Monckton-Arundell, eldest son of the Viscount Galway
 Hon. Rowland Flower, eldest son of the Viscount Ashbrook
 Hon. Oliver Vesey, eldest son of the Viscount de Vesci
 Hon. James Hewitt, eldest son of the Viscount Lifford
 Hon. Nathaniel St Leger, eldest son of the Viscount Doneraile
 Hon. Patrick Pomeroy, eldest son of the Viscount Harberton
 Hon. Varian Maude, eldest son of the Viscount Hawarden
 Hon. James Jervis, eldest son of the Viscount St Vincent
 Hon. John Addington, eldest son of the Viscount Sidmouth
 Hon. Robert Vereker, eldest son of the Viscount Gort
 Hon. Edward Pellew, eldest son of the Viscount Exmouth
 Hon. Laszlo Stapleton-Cotton, eldest son of the Viscount Combermere
 Hon. Michael Clegg-Hill, eldest son of the Viscount Hill
 Hon. Peregrine Hood, eldest son of the Viscount Bridport
 Hon. Luke Portman, eldest son of the Viscount Portman
 Hon. Lucian Brant, eldest son of the Viscount Hampden
 Hon. Henry Holland-Hibbert, eldest son of the Viscount Knutsford
 Hon. Matthew Brett, eldest son of the Viscount Esher
 Hon. Alexander Goschen, eldest son of the Viscount Goschen
 Hon. Matthew Ridley, eldest son of the Viscount Ridley
 Hon. Patrick Knollys, eldest son of the Viscount Knollys
 Hon. Wentworth Beaumont, eldest son of the Viscount Allendale
 Hon. Oliver Akers-Douglas, eldest son of the Viscount Chilston
 Hon. Peregrine Pearson, eldest son of the Viscount Cowdray
 Hon. William Astor, eldest son of the Viscount Astor
 Hon. Ivor Guest, eldest son of the Viscount Wimborne
 Hon. Richard Harmsworth, eldest son of the Viscount Rothermere
 Hon. Harry Allenby, eldest son of the Viscount Allenby
 Hon. Frederic Thesiger, eldest son of the Viscount Chelmsford
 Hon. Benjamin Lowther, eldest son of the Viscount Ullswater
 Hon. Alexander Younger, eldest son of the Viscount Younger of Leckie
 Hon. Harry Samuel, eldest son of the Viscount Bearsted
 Hon. Luke Bridgeman, eldest son of the Viscount Bridgeman
 Hon. Quintin Hogg, eldest son of the Viscount Hailsham
 Hon. Paul Joynson-Hicks, eldest son of the Viscount Brentford
 Hon. Andrew Buckmaster, eldest son of the Viscount Buckmaster
 Hon. Benjamin Bathurst, eldest son of the Viscount Bledisloe
 Hon. Alexander Trenchard, eldest son of the Viscount Trenchard
 Hon. Thomas Runciman, eldest son of the Viscount Runciman of Doxford
 Hon. James Weir, eldest son of the Viscount Weir
 Hon. Thomas Inskip, eldest son of the Viscount Caldecote
 Hon. Hugo Berry, eldest son of the Viscount Camrose
 Hon. Daniel Wedgwood-Benn, eldest son of the Viscount Stansgate
 Hon. Humphrey FitzRoy Newdegate, eldest son of the Viscount Daventry
 Hon. Paul Addison, eldest son of the Viscount Addison
 Hon. Luke Berry, eldest son of the Viscount Kemsley
 Hon. Kit Penny, eldest son of the Viscount Marchwood
 Hon. Forbes Anderson, eldest son of the Viscount Waverley
 Hon. James Sinclair, eldest son of the Viscount Thurso
 Hon. James Leathers, eldest son of the Viscount Leathers
 Hon. Herwald Ramsbotham, eldest son of the Viscount Soulbury
 Hon. Oliver Lyttleton, eldest son of the Viscount Chandos
 Hon. Philip Sidney, eldest son of the Viscount De L'Isle
 Hon. Timothy Lloyd George, eldest son of the Viscount Tenby
 Hon. Thomas Mackintosh, eldest son of the Viscount Mackintosh of Halifax
 Hon. Callum Morrison, eldest son of the Viscount Dunrossil
 Hon. Rufus Slim, eldest son of the Viscount Slim
 Hon. Henry Head, eldest son of the Viscount Head
 Hon. Benjamin Lennox-Boyd, eldest son of the Viscount Boyd of Merton
 Hon. William Eccles, eldest son of the Viscount Eccles
 Hon. Edward Manningham-Buller, eldest son of the Viscount Dilhorne
 Hon. Francis Charles Robert Dillon, eldest son of the Viscount Dillon

Heirs presumptive

	Walter St John, second cousin twice removed of the Viscount Bolingbroke and St John
	Colin Cranmer-Byng, fifth cousin of the Viscount Torrington
	Hon. Peter Annesley, brother of the Viscount Valentia
	Rupert Dawney, cousin of the Viscount Downe
	Hon. William Molesworth, brother of the Viscount Molesworth
	Hon. Guy Wingfield, uncle of the Viscount Powerscourt
       Hon. Charles Southwell, brother of the Viscount Southwell
	Hon. Edward Ward, half-brother of the Viscount Bangor
	Hon. George Monck, brother of the Viscount Monck
	Hon. James Dundas, brother of the Viscount Melville
	Hon. Jamie Hardinge, brother of the Viscount Hardinge
	Hon. Bernardo Smith, brother of the Viscount Hambleden
	Hon. Richmond Colville, brother of the Viscount Colville of Culross
	Hon. James Gully, great-uncle of the Viscount Selby
	Hon. David Curzon, brother of the Viscount Scarsdale
	Hon. David Bigham, uncle of the Viscount Mersey
	Chester Kearley, first cousin of the Viscount Devonport
	Hon. Roland Philipps, brother of the Viscount St Davids
	Harold Pollock, nephew of the Viscount Hanworth
	Hon. Benjamin Samuel, half-brother of the Viscount Samuel
	Hon. Christopher Brooke, brother of the Viscount Brookeborough
	Hon. Martin Huggins, uncle of the Viscount Malvern
	Hon. Timothy Monckton, brother of the Viscount Monckton of Brenchley
	Hon. Andrew Stuart, half-brother of the Viscount Stuart of Findhorn
	George Kemp, nephew of the Viscount Rochdale

Viscounts without heirs

Viscount Davidson, Viscount Gough, Viscount Long, Viscount Craigavon, Viscount Margesson, Viscount Montgomery of Alamein, Viscount Mills, and Viscount Norwich.

See also
British nobility
List of viscountcies in the peerages of Britain and Ireland

References

Lists of peerages of Britain and Ireland
Lists of nobility
Peerages in the United Kingdom